Fancy Free is an album by American jazz trumpeter Donald Byrd that was recorded and released in 1969 by Blue Note Records.

Reception
AllMusic awarded the album with 3 stars and its review by Steve Huey says, "Recorded just a few months after Miles Davis' In a Silent Way, Fancy Free finds Byrd leading a large ensemble prominently featuring Frank Foster on tenor, Lew Tabackin or Jerry Dodgion on flute, and several percussionists. But the most important piece of the puzzle is Duke Pearson's electric piano, the first time Byrd utilized the instrument." Critic Marc Myers described the album in 2018 as "decades ahead of its time". Myers also wrote that the album began a new period in Byrd's career, in which, "Unlike rock fusion, which was popular with sit-down audiences in college dorm rooms and events, Byrd focused more on grooves and beats, accompanying them on his trumpet rather than being driven by them."

Track listing
 "Fancy Free" (Donald Byrd) – 12:06
 "I Love the Girl" (Byrd) – 8:48
 "The Uptowner" (Mitch Farber) – 9:16
 "Weasil" (Charles Hendricks) – 9:00

Note
Recorded on May 9 (#2, 4) and June 6, 1969. (#1, 3)

Personnel
Donald Byrd – trumpet
Julian Priester – trombone
Frank Foster –  tenor and soprano saxophone
 Jerry Dodgion (#1, 3) – flute
Lew Tabackin (#2, 4) – flute
Duke Pearson – electric piano
Jimmy Ponder – guitar
Roland Wilson – bass guitar
Joe Chambers (#2, 4), Leo Morris (#1, 3) – drums
Nat Bettis – percussion
 John H. Robinson Jr.  – percussion

References

1970 albums
Donald Byrd albums
Blue Note Records albums
Albums produced by Duke Pearson